The Tomahittan were Native Americans whom Virginians James Needham and Gabriel Arthur tried to contact in order to bypass the taxes of the Occaneechi "middlemen" natives.

What tribe the Tomahittan belongs to is in dispute. For many years, scholars accepted that the Tomahittans were either Yuchi or Cherokee, and that the town visited by Needham and Arthur was somewhere west of the Blue Ridge Mountains. One investigation places the Tomahittans around the vicinity of present-day Rome, Georgia.

Other sources record that Tomahitan was the name of the main town of the Nottoway people in Southside Virginia. Some authors have mistaken the Tomahitans for the Cherokee, but in 1727 a delegation of Cherokee visiting Charleston referred to the Tomahitans as old enemies of their allies, the Yamasee.

According to archaeologist Gregory Waselkov, the Tomahittan are "a Hitichiti-speaking group, probably a splinter from the Ocute paramount chiefdom on the Oconee River who moved to this vicinity in the late seventeenth century after the fall of Ocute."

Gabriel Arthur claimed that the Tomahittans kept men of the "Weesock" tribe as warrior slaves. Historian John R. Swanton has proposed that the "Weesock" were in fact the Waxhaw.

References

Extinct Native American tribes
Native American history of Virginia
Yuchi
Native American history of Georgia (U.S. state)